Shota Onodera (born November 6, 1994) is a Japanese professional basketball player who plays for Ryukyu Golden Kings of the B.League in Japan. On January 25, 2015, he recorded a career-high 27 points in a win to the Gunma Crane Thunders.

Career statistics

Regular season 

|-
| align="left" | 2013-14
| align="left" | Iwate
| 34|| 4|| 9.8|| 36.5|| 16.7|| 66.7|| 0.9|| 0.4|| 0.6|| 0.1|| 2.1
|-
| align="left" | 2014-15
| align="left" | Iwate
| 52|| 29|| 17.5|| 43.3|| 40.3|| 76.0|| 1.8|| 0.8|| 0.6|| 0.0||  5.9
|-
| align="left" | 2015-16
| align="left" | Iwate
| 48|| 24|| 19.6|| 38.9|| 33.8|| 62.9|| 1.9|| 0.9|| 0.8|| 0.1|| 5.4
|-
| align="left" | 2016-17
| align="left" | Iwate
| 56|| 24|| 24.5|| 34.3|| 28.7|| 72.0|| 2.0|| 1.4|| 0.5|| 0.2||  7.3
|-
| align="left" | 2017-18
| align="left" | Akita
|56 ||36 ||19.2 ||41.3 ||32.8 ||65.2 ||2.1 || 2.7|| 0.8||0.1 || 7.8
|-
| align="left" | 2018-19
| align="left" | Akita
| 47 || 37 || 24.4 ||36.9  ||30.6  || 69.9 || 1.8 || 3.0||  0.8 ||0.1 ||5.8
|-
| align="left" | 2019-20
| align="left" | Ryukyu
| 39 || 23 || 18.5 ||37.8  ||22.2  || 63.2 || 1.8 || 1.2|| 0.7 ||0.1 ||4.5
|-
| align="left" | 2020-21
| align="left" | Ryukyu
| 25 || 1 || 8.0 ||.412  ||.350  || .583 || 0.8 || 0.4|| 0.3 ||0.0 ||1.7
|-
|}

Playoffs 

|-
|style="text-align:left;"|2017-18
|style="text-align:left;"|Akita
| 5 || 5 || 17.16 || .382 || .333 || .500 || 2.4 || 3.6 || 1.2 || 0 || 6.2
|-

Terrific 12

|-
| align="left" |  2019
| align="left" | Ryukyu
|2|| ||21.2|| || || || 3.0||4.0 || 0.5|| 0.0|| 4.0
|-

Early cup games 

|-
|style="text-align:left;"|2017
|style="text-align:left;"|Akita
| 2 || 1 || 24:19 || .429 || .400 || .500 || 0.5 || 1.5 || 0.5 || 0 || 4.5
|-
|style="text-align:left;"|2018
|style="text-align:left;"|Akita
|2 || 1 || 24:06 || .429 || .000 || .500 || 3.5 || 2.5 || 1.5 || 0 || 7.5
|-
|style="text-align:left;"|2019
|style="text-align:left;"|Ryukyu
|2 || 1 || 20:00|| .286 || .000 || .500 || 1.5 || 2.5 || 0.5 || 0 || 2.5
|-

Preseason games

|-
| align="left" |2018
| align="left" | Akita
| 2 || 1 || 18.0 || .273 ||.167  || .500||1.0 || 2.5|| 0.0 || 0.0 ||  4.5
|-

Source: Changwon1Changwon2

Number 34

Onodera has revealed that he wears the number 34 shirt  because it is the interchange number of Ichinoseki where he was born, the Akita Sakigake reported.

Athletic taping
He uses the Nichiban sports tapes.

References

External links

1994 births
Living people
Akita Northern Happinets players
Iwate Big Bulls players
Japanese men's basketball players
Point guards
Ryukyu Golden Kings players
Shooting guards
Sportspeople from Iwate Prefecture
People from Ichinoseki, Iwate